Roger Kish is an American wrestler and the current head coach of the wrestling team at North Dakota State.  A native of Lapeer, Michigan, Kish was a four-time Michigan state wrestling champion. Kish is currently tied for ninth all time on the Michigan high school single season win record list. He is second all time on the mhsaa career wins compiling a record of 252-2. Kish went on to become only the 11th 4 time champion in mhsaa history. He next wrestled at the University of Minnesota, compiling a career record of 117-27.  As a sophomore and a junior in college, he finished 2nd at the national tournament.  After leaving the University of Minnesota, Kish became an assistant wrestling coach at North Dakota State University.  He was hired as the head coach at North Dakota State in 2011 and became the youngest NCAA Division I head coach in any sport.
He has also been known as a huge fan of the Chicago pizza chain Giordano’s, publicly proclaiming his love for its famous deep dish pizza. This led them to offer him a role as state sponsor for North Dakota, which Kish rejected due to NCAA coach rules. His nickname, which he is well know nationally for, is “beefy boi”. The nickname prompted another famous Chicago restaurant, Buona Beef, to offer him another sponsorship, which Kish once again denied, stating “Beefy Boi reps Beefy brand” was a terrible advertising campaign.

References 

Year of birth missing (living people)
Living people
North Dakota State Bison wrestling coaches
Minnesota Golden Gophers wrestlers
People from Lapeer, Michigan